(born 29 July 1999) is a Japanese professional golfer. She plays on the LPGA of Japan Tour where she has 12 wins.

Inami competed at the 2020 Summer Olympics. At those games, Inami shot a final round 65 and defeated Lydia Ko in a sudden-death playoff to win a silver medal in women's individual, on home soil.

Professional wins

LPGA of Japan Tour wins (12)

Tournaments in bold denotes major tournaments in LPGA of Japan Tour.

Summer Olympics (1)

Singles: 1 (1 Silver Medal)

References

External links

Japanese female golfers
LPGA of Japan Tour golfers
Olympic golfers of Japan
Golfers at the 2020 Summer Olympics
Olympic silver medalists for Japan
Olympic medalists in golf
Medalists at the 2020 Summer Olympics
1999 births
Living people
21st-century Japanese women